In politics, a political scandal is an action or event regarded as morally or legally wrong and causing general public outrage. Politicians, government officials, party officials and lobbyists can be accused of various illegal, corrupt,  unethical or sexual practices. Scandalized politicians are more likely to retire or get lower vote shares.

Journalism 
Scandal sells, and broadsides, pamphlets, newspapers, magazines and the electronic media have covered it in depth.  The Muckraker movement in American journalism was a component of the Progressive Era in the U.S. in the early 20th century.  Journalists have built their careers on exposure of corruption and political scandal, often acting on behalf of the opposition party.
     
There are numerous contextual factors that make a scandal noteworthy, such as the importance of the people, the depth of conspiracy and the coverup strategies used.
     
The political ideology of media owners plays a role—they prefer to target the opposition but will reluctantly cover their own side.  Journalists have to frame the story in terms of the audience's values and expectations to maximize the impact.

Lists by country

 Albania – Political scandals of Albania
 Argentina – List of political scandals in Argentina
 Australia – List of Australian political controversies
 Austria – List of political scandals in Austria
 Belgium – Belgian political scandals
 Canada – List of Canadian political scandals
 Chile – Chilean political scandals
 Colombia – Colombian parapolitics scandal
 France – French political scandals
 Germany – German political scandals
 Iceland – Icelandic political scandals
 India – Indian political scandals
 Ireland – Irish political scandals
 Italy – Italian political scandals
 Japan – Black Mist Scandal (Japanese politics)
 Lithuania – Generic article on corruption in Lithuania
 New Zealand – List of political scandals in New Zealand
Malaysia – List of scandals in Malaysia
 Philippines – List of political scandals in the Philippines
 Poland - List of political scandals in Poland
 Slovakia – List of Slovak political scandals
 Slovenia – 1975 Zaliv Scandal
South Korea – Political scandals in South Korea
 United Kingdom – List of political scandals in the United Kingdom

 United States  – List of federal political scandals in the United States
 Ukraine – List of political scandals in Ukraine

See also
Deviancy amplification spiral
Mass media
Moral panic
Sensationalism
Sex scandal

References

Further reading
 Canel, Maria Jose and Karen Sanders. Morality Tales: Political Scandals and Journalism in Britain and Spain in the 1990s (2005)
 Dagnes, Alison and Mark Sachleben. "Scandal! An Interdisciplinary Approach to the Consequences, Outcomes, and Significance of Political Scandals" (Bloomsbury 2013)
 Dziuda, Wioletta; Howell, William G. 2020. "Political Scandal: A Theory." American Journal of Political Science.        
Fisher, Trevor. Scandal: Sexual Politics of Late Victorian Britain (1995)        
 Giroux, Gary. Business Scandals, Corruption, and Reform: An Encyclopedia (2013)        
 Grossman, Mark. Political Corruption in America: An Encyclopedia of Scandals, Power, and Greed (2008)
 Heidenheimer, Arnold and M. Johnston. Political corruption: Concepts and contexts (2002)
 King, Anthony. Sex, Money and Power: Political Scandals in Great Britain and the United States (1984) 
 Kohn, George C. The New Encyclopedia of American Scandal (2000)     
 MacMullen, Ramsay. Corruption and the Decline of Rome (1990)
 Scott, James C. Comparative political corruption (1972)
 Temple, Kathryn. Scandal Nation: Law and Authorship in Britain, 1750–1832 (2002)

External links